Kala Nera ( meaning "good waters") is a village in the municipal unit of Milies, Magnesia, Greece. It is situated in the western part of the mountainous Pelion peninsula, on the Pagasetic Gulf coast. It is 3 km southwest of Milies, 5 km southeast of Agios Georgios Nileias and 17 km southeast of Volos.  Its population was 594 in the year 2011.

Population

See also
List of settlements in the Magnesia regional unit

References

External links
Kala Nera Travel Site
Kala Nera on GTP Travel Pages

Dissolved municipalities and communes in Greece
Populated places in Pelion